Merzig-Wadern is a Kreis (district) in the northwest of the Saarland, Germany. Neighboring districts are Trier-Saarburg, Sankt Wendel, Saarlouis, the French département Moselle, and Luxembourg.

History
The district was created in 1816 when the area became property of Prussia. After World War I the Saar area was under special government of the League of Nations, which split the district into two. The area around Wadern stayed Prussian, while the Merzig area became part of the Saar area. In 1935, the Saar area rejoined Germany; however, it took till after the World War II that the two parts of the district were reunited in 1946.

Geography
The river Saar flows through the district, the Moselle forms the boundary in the west to Luxembourg.

Coat of arms
The coat of arms show the symbols of those countries which had possessions in the district's area. The top-left show the cross of Trier, the top-right those of Lorraine. The wolf hook in the bottom-left represents Dagstuhl, which owned Wadern; the lion in the bottom-right stands for Luxembourg, which owned the western part of the district.

Towns and municipalities

Education

Primary schools 

 Primary school Dreiländereck Perl
 Primary school Langwies of the municipality Mettlach
 Primary school Orscholz
 Nicolaus-Voltz primary school Losheim
 Primary school Bachem-Britten
 Primary school elections
 Primary school Düppenweiler
 Primary school Beckingen
 Primary school Reimsbach
 Primary school Kreuzberg (Merzig)
 Primary school Merzig-Besseringen
 Primary school Merzig-Brotdorf
 Primary school Merzig-Hilbringen
 Primary School Saargau (Schwemlingen)
 Primary School St. Josef (Merzig)
 Primary school St. Martin Wadrill-Steinberg with the locations Wadrill and Steinberg
 Primary school Nunkirchen with the locations Nunkirchen and Bardenbach
 Primary school Lockweiler
 Primary school Konfeld

Grammar schools

 German-Luxembourgish Schengen Lyceum Perl 
 Gymnasium am Stefansberg (GaS)
 Oberstufen-Gymnasium of the BBZ 'Merzig subdivided into the faculties health and social affairs as well as economics 
 Peter Wust Gymnasium (PWG) 
 Hochwald-Gymnasium Wadern

Community schools 

 Community school Orscholz
 Peter Dewes Community School Losheim am See
 Friedrich Bernhard Karcher School Beckingen
 Christian Kretzschmar School Merzig
 Count Anton School Wadern
 Eichenlaubschule Weiskirchen

Special schools 

 Special Education Learning Losheim
 School zum Broch, special school mental development Merzig-Merchingen
 Special school for learning disabled people Merzig-Brotdorf
 Special School Learning Wadern

Occupational schools 

 BBZ Merzig
 BBZ-Hochwald

References

External links

 

 
Districts of the Saarland